Louise Brough and Margaret duPont successfully defended their title, defeating Shirley Fry and Doris Hart in the final, 6–4, 5–7, 6–1 to win the ladies' doubles tennis title at the 1950 Wimbledon Championships.

Seeds

  Louise Brough /  Margaret duPont (champions)
  Shirley Fry /  Doris Hart (final)
  Gussie Moran /  Pat Todd (quarterfinals)
  Betty Harrison /  Kay Tuckey (quarterfinals)

Draw

Finals

Top half

Section 1

Section 2

Bottom half

Section 3

Section 4

References

External links

Women's Doubles
Wimbledon Championship by year – Women's doubles
Wimbledon Championships
Wimbledon Championships